Rok Urbanc (born 28 February 1985) is a Slovenian former ski jumper. He won his first World Cup event in Zakopane in 2007.

World Cup

Standings

Wins

References

External links

1985 births
Living people
Slovenian male ski jumpers
Sportspeople from Jesenice, Jesenice
21st-century Slovenian people